On a Clear Day is a 2005 Scottish drama film written by Alex Rose and directed by Gaby Dellal. It stars Peter Mullan as Frank Redmond, an engineer in the shipyards on the River Clyde, who becomes stagnant and quickly sinks into depression following his redundancy.  A naturally strong swimmer, Frank gets an idea while on a 'booze cruise' with his friends to swim the English Channel. Featuring an ensemble cast, it co-stars Brenda Blethyn, Sean McGinley and Billy Boyd, among others.

The filmed won two BAFTA Scotland Awards for Best Film and Best Screenplay.

Plot
The story is set in Glasgow, Scotland near the banks of the River Clyde. After completing the construction of the ship RFA Mounts Bay, Frank Redmond (played by Peter Mullan) and a few of his co-workers are laid off from the shipyards after 36 years service. This, along with his grief still suffered over the drowning of one of his sons many years ago, plummets Frank into a deep depression. He gets on well with his wife, Joan (Brenda Blethyn), but their relationship is distant. His other son, Rob (Jamie Sives), is a devoted house husband who looks after his twin sons, while his wife, Angela (Jodhi May) works full-time at the local Jobcentre. Rob has a troubled relationship with his father, feeling the guilt of being the 'surviving' son.

After a violent panic attack, Frank realizes that he needs some focus in his life, and, after a booze cruise along the English Channel, decides to focus his efforts on swimming across it. Frank trains with the help of friend and local chip shop owner Chan (Benedict Wong) and former co-workers Danny (Billy Boyd), Eddie (Sean McGinley) and Norman (Ron Cook) until he feels he is fit and ready for the attempt. A successful crossing alleviates the family tensions.

Filming locations
The production visited Kent to shoot at the foot of the White Cliffs of Dover where Frank starts his swim of the English Channel and the famous cliffs can also be seen in the background throughout his challenge. The Port of Dover was used for the scenes where Frank’s family and friends race to meet him in France at the end of his swim.

Cast
 Peter Mullan as Frank Redmond
 Brenda Blethyn as Joan Redmond
 Jamie Sives as Rob Redmond
 Jodhi May as Angela Redmond
 Billy Boyd as Danny
 Benedict Wong as Chan
 Sean McGinley as Eddie
 Ron Cook as Norman
 Shaun Dingwall as Observer
 Tony Roper as Merv

External links

References

2005 films
Scottish films
Focus Features films
Icon Productions films
Films about grieving
Films directed by Gaby Dellal
Films scored by Stephen Warbeck
English-language Scottish films
2000s English-language films